Pierre Kersten (1789–1865) was a Belgian journalist and publisher, active in Liège from 1821 until his death.

Life
Kersten was born in Maastricht on 19 January 1789. For some years he worked as a teacher of Greek at a secondary school in the city. In 1821 he became the editor of the daily newspaper Courrier de la Meuse, owned by Dieudonné Stas. A Catholic by conviction, in the Belgian Revolution Kersten was a member of a Constitutional Association in Liège that brought together Catholic and Liberal opposition to the government of William I of the Netherlands. In 1834 he left the Courrier de la Meuse to launch his own monthly review, the Journal historique et littéraire. He also worked as a publisher and printer, particularly of liturgical books. He died in Liège on 5 January 1865.

Works
 Epitome Novi Testamenti (1821)
 De rebus belgicis libri quindecim (1830)
 Choix de petites instructions, à l'usage de MM. les curés et vicaires des villes et des campagnes (5 vols., 1830)
 Entretiens d'un père avec sa fille, lorsqu'elle se préparait à faire sa première communion (1834)
 Notice sur la révérende mère Joseph de Jésus (Anne Capitaine), religieuse carmélite (1848) 
 Essai sur l'activité du principe pensant considérée dans l'institution du langage (3 vols., 1851–1863)

References

1789 births
1865 deaths
Belgian journalists
Male journalists
Belgian editors
Belgian magazine editors
19th-century journalists